Irene Del Carmen Núñez Quintero (born 11 June 1987), is a Panamanian model and beauty pageant contestant who won the  Miss World Panama 2011 title.

Pageant participations
In 2009 won the Miss Tourism International Panamá 2009 and participate in the Miss Tourism International 2009 in Malaysia. She was Semi-finalists (top 10).

Miss Panamá 2011
She represented Veraguas state.

Miss World 2011
She represented Panama in the 61st Miss World 2011 pageant, held at London, United Kingdom on November 6, 2011 but did no place. She place Top 24 at Miss World Sport
and Top 36 at Miss World Beach Beauty

References

See also
Sheldry Sáez
Keity Drennan

1987 births
Living people
Miss World 2011 delegates
Panamanian beauty pageant winners
Panamanian female models
Señorita Panamá
People from Panama City